Ceratium furca is a species of marine dinoflagellates.

Description
This species has a straight body which is 70-200 µm long and 30-50 µm wide, with the epitheca gradually tapering into an anterior horn. C. furca has long spines, and is an "armoured" species with a theca of thick cellulose plates. The cells are nearly flat, with the ventral side concave and the dorsal side being convex.

Distribution
Ceratium furca is found worldwide.

Subspecies
Ceratium furca eugrammum
Ceratium furca furca

References

Further reading
Dodge, J. D. 1982. Marine Dinoflagellates of the British Isles. Her Majesty's Stationery Office, London. 303 pp.

Hansen, G. & Larsen, J. 1992. Dinoflagellater i danske farvande. In: Thomsen, H. A. (ed.) Plankton i de indre danske farvande. Havforskning fra Miljøstyrelsen, Copenhagen, p. 45-155.

Steidinger, K. A. & Tangen, K. 1996. Dinoflagellates. In: Tomas, C. R. (ed.) Identifying marine diatoms and dinoflagellates. Academic Press, Inc., San Diego, p. 387-584.

Species described in 1859
Gonyaulacales